Gnathothlibus dabrera is a moth of the  family Sphingidae. It is known from Sulawesi.

References

Gnathothlibus
Moths described in 1999